Mucrospirifer is a genus of extinct brachiopods in the class Rhynchonellata (Articulata) and the order Spiriferida. They are sometimes known as "butterfly shells". Like other brachiopods, they were filter feeders. These fossils occur mainly in Middle Devonian strata and appear to occur around the world, except in Australia and Antarctica.

The biconvex shell was typically 2.5 cm long, but sometimes grew to 4 cm. The shell of Mucrospirifer has a fold, sulcus and costae. It is greatly elongated along the hinge line, which extends outward to form sharp points. This gives them a fin- or wing-like appearance. The apex area (umbo) of the pedicle valve contains a small fold for the pedicle. Mucrospirifer lived in muddy marine sediments, and were attached to the sea floor via the pedicle. The shell sometimes looks like two seashells stuck together.

Species

Mucrospirifer albanensis
Mucrospirifer arkonensis
Mucrospirifer bouchardi
Mucrospirifer diluvianoides
Mucrospirifer grabaui
Mucrospirifer medfordsis
Mucrospirifer mucronatus (Conrad, 1841)
Mucrospirifer paradoxiformis
Mucrospirifer profundus
Mucrospirifer prolificus
Mucrospirifer refugiensis
Mucrospirifer thedfordensis
Mucrospirifer williamsi

References

External links
 Color reconstruction of Mucrospirifer arkonensis at www.emilydamstra.com

Spiriferida
Prehistoric brachiopod genera
Devonian brachiopods
Paleozoic brachiopods of North America
Paleozoic brachiopods of Europe
Paleozoic life of Ontario
Paleozoic life of the Northwest Territories
Fossils of Brazil
Fossils of Canada
Fossils of China
Fossils of Colombia
Fossils of Germany
Fossils of Iran
Fossils of Libya
Fossils of Russia
Fossils of Spain
Fossils of the United States
Fossils of Venezuela
Fossils of Vietnam
Fossil taxa described in 1931
Taxa described in 1931